Chettinad (also known as Chettinadu) is a region located mainly in the Sivaganga district historically ruled by Ramnad kingdom of Pandya Nadu and has a small portion extending into the Pudukottai District in Tamil Nadu, India..Karaikudi and  Devekottai are the Major Towns of this Area

Etymology
The name means "land (nadu) of the Chettiars".

Demography
In the 19th and early 20th centuries, many residents of Chettinad were trading in South and Southeast Asia, particularly Burma, Ceylon, Vietnam and Malaysia. It finds itself in the UNESCO nomination for palatial house sites of historic and cultural value.

Community
Chettinad is the home of the Nattukottai Chettiars (Nagarathar), a prosperous banking and business community and for high hierarchy, non-Brahmin Vallambar (Vellalar) feudal community with an aristocrat title Nattar - Ambalam. It is also known for its local cuisine, architecture, and religious temples.

Chettinad cuisine

The word "Chettiar" refers to the social caste of mercantile bankers. The Chettiars are known to be traders in salt and spices and this is reflected in the Chettinad cuisine. Meals also consist of cooked lentils, Brinjal curry, drumstick sambar, ghee for flavouring rice, and sweet meals like payasam and paal paniyaram. In general, beef and pork dishes are not served. Some well-known local dishes are Chicken Chettinad (spicy chicken curry), Vegetable Chettinad (a vegetable curry) and dishes featuring seafood.

Architecture

The Chettinad region is well known for its 19th-century mansions, whose wide courtyards and spacious rooms are embellished with marble and teak. Construction materials, decorative items, and furnishings were mostly imported from East Asian countries and Europe. The marble was brought from Italy, chandeliers and teak from Burma, crockery from Indonesia, crystals from Europe and wall-to-wall mirrors from Belgium.

Many of these mansions were built using a type of limestone known as karai. Local legend has it that the mansion walls were polished with a paste made out of egg whites to give them a smooth texture.

Temples
Originally built by early Tamil dynasties like the Cholas, the temples of Chettinad stand testimony to the spiritual beliefs of local people. Temples are built per Vaastu Shastras and Agamas as the Chettinad wealthy sponsored the buildings and the shilpis after the royal families declined. On the side note, traditional houses were also built per ancient text on an architecture called Vaastu Shastras.

Each temple has its own tank called oorani where water lilies are grown and used for holy rituals. Even today, much of Chettinad's daily activities are centered around the festivities of the temple. Among the many famous temples are: Vairavan Kovil, Iraniyur, Karpaga Vinayakar, Kundrakudi Murugan, Kottaiyur Sivan, and Kandanur Sivan temples, with each having its own unique deity.

Vinayagar Chathurthi is celebrated every year, on the day when the two stars Shasti and Sadhayam mingle together. This day typically falls as the 22nd day after Periya Karthigai. Pillaiyar Nonmbu, its name, is usually in the month of December. On this day, they sing songs of the deity Lord Vinayagar and then take a sweet called Ellai.

Local crafts

Sari
The cotton sari, also known as kandaangi, is unique in its dramatic patterns and colors. Its vibrance and weight are its distinguishing factors. Records and old photographs show the use of sari by previous generations, before the advent of blouses and underskirts, and thus worn rather differently from the typical contemporary sari. At present, it is available in Kundi.

Aathangudi tiles
Athangudi tiles, named after the place of the manufacture in Chettinad, come in a myriad of colours and patterns, and are made by a unique process using local soil and glass plates. These tiles are a testament to the rich cultural heritage of the Chettiar community, who effectively adapted many influences to their own brand of local craftsmanship. The designs and colours used in Athangudi tiles are still those of a bygone era. However, of late, new designs and patterns are being incorporated.

The Athangudi tiles are hand-made. However, with a short shelf life and relatively slow manufacturing process, these tiles are not much in demand. The situation has led to the decline in the market.

Industry

Chettinad's principal town, Karaikudi is also the location of a branch of the Central Electro Chemical Research Institute (CECRI), one of the forty national laboratories under the aegis of the Council of Scientific and Industrial Research (CSIR) in New Delhi. The CSIR lab specializes in electro-chemical research and has been operational for more than fifty years. The campus is on over 300 scenic acres, filled with traditional and ornamental vegetation. CECRI conducts four-year Engineering and Technology courses in chemical and electro-chemical engineering and technology affiliated with the Anna University in Chennai.

Travel
The nearest airports are Madurai Airport and Tiruchirappalli International Airport while the largest towns in the area are Karaikudi and Devakottai. Trains that run from Chennai to Rameshwaram stop at Pudukkottai, Karaikudi, Kanadukaathan (Chettinad Station), Devakottai and Kallal. Karaikudi Junction railway station is the major station. Karaikkudi and Aranthangi railway station. There are also frequent town buses connects Chettinad to Karaikudi, Ponnamaravathy, Devakottai Pudukkottai and Aranthangi.

Notable people
 Alagappa Chettiar - founder of the various educational institutions in Karaikudi and its surroundings. Alagappa University, Alagappa Chettiar College of Engineering and Technology, and Alagappa Government Arts College are a few institutes named in his honour.
 Annamalai Chettiar - founder of Indian Bank and the Annamalai University bears his name.
 Muthiah Chettiar 
 S. Rm. Muthiah Chettiar  
 M. A. M. Muthiah
 M. A. M. Ramaswamy 
 M. A. Chidambaram 
 P. Chidambaram - former Finance Minister of India.
 Kaviarasar Kannadasan - Tamil poet.
 Justice A. R. Lakshmanan (b. 1942) - former judge of the Supreme Court of India and current chairman of the Law Commission of India.
 Lena Chettiar
 A. V. Meiyappan - founder of AVM Productions, the oldest and largest film production studio in Kollywood, the Tamil language film industry of India.    
 Hari Sevugan 
 Rama Narayanan, film director and producer 
 Sp Muthuraman, film director and producer 
 Vasanth, director
 Soma Valliappan

References

External links

Sivaganga district